In Judaism, yetzer hara ( yēṣer haraʿ) is the congenital inclination to do evil, by violating the will of God. The term is drawn from the phrase "the imagination of the heart of man [is] evil" (yetzer lev-ha-adam ra), which occurs twice at the beginning of the Torah (Genesis 6:5 and Genesis 8:21).  

The Hebrew word "yetzer" having appeared twice in Genesis occurs again at the end of the Torah: "I knew their devisings that they do". Thus from beginning to end the heart's "yetzer" (plan) is continually bent on evil. However, the Torah which began with blessing  anticipates future blessing  which will come as a result of God circumcising the heart in the latter days.

In traditional Judaism, the yetzer hara is not a demonic force, but rather man's misuse of things the physical body needs to survive. Thus, the need for food becomes gluttony due to the yetzer hara. The need for procreation becomes promiscuity, and so on.

The Jewish concept of the yetzer hara is similar to the Christian concept of a "sin nature" known as concupiscence, which is the tendency of humans to sin. However, concupiscence stems explicitly from original sin, while the yetzer hara is a natural part of God's creation.

According to the Talmudic tractate Avot de-Rabbi Natan, a boy's evil inclination is greater than his good inclination until he turns 13 (bar mitzvah), at which point the good inclination is "born" and able to control his behavior. Moreover, the rabbis have stated: "The greater the man, the greater his [evil] inclination."

Free will, and the choice between evil and good inclinations 
The underlying principle in Jewish thought states that each person — Jew and gentile alike — is born with both a good and an evil inclination. Possessing an evil inclination is considered neither bad nor abnormal. The problem, however, arises when one makes a willful choice to "cross over the line," and seeks to gratify his evil inclination, based on the prototypical models of right and wrong in the Hebrew Bible. This notion is succinctly worded in the Babylonian Talmud: "Everything is determined by heaven, except one's fear of heaven," meaning, everything in a person's life is predetermined by God—except that person's choice to be either righteous or wicked, which is left to their free will.

The Bible states that every person on some occasion succumbs to his evil inclination: "For there is not a righteous man upon earth, that doeth good, and sinneth not." The Talmud speaks of the difficulty in overcoming the evil inclination: “To what is it like, the evil inclination in man? It is like a father who takes his small son, bathes him, douses him with perfume, combs his hair, dresses him up in his finest accoutrements, feeds him, gives him drink, places a bag of money around his neck, and then goes off and puts his son at the front door of a brothel. What can the boy do that he not sin?” In recognition of this difficulty, repentance (and in some cases, affliction) is said to atone for most sins, while the preponderance of good works keeps him within the general class of good men.

Maimonides gave instructions for how to view the Evil Inclination and ensuing hardships on that account:

Moshe Chaim Luzzatto wrote in Derech Hashem that "Man is the creature created for the purpose of being drawn close to God. He is placed between perfection and deficiency, with the power to earn perfection. Man must earn this perfection, however, through his own free will... Man's inclinations are therefore balanced between good (Yetzer HaTov) and evil (Yetzer HaRa), and he is not compelled toward either of them. He has the power of choice and is able to choose either side knowingly and willingly..."

The power within man to overcome sin 
While God has created man with both good and evil inclinations, the two powers or tendencies that pull him in opposite directions, God commands each man to choose the good and right path over the evil. In the narrative of Cain and Abel, God tells Cain: “Isn’t it true that if you do good, you shall be forgiven? However, if you will not do good, it is because sin crouches at the entrance [of your heart], and to you shall be its longing, although you have the ability to subdue it.” Medieval commentator Rashi explains: “and to you shall be its longing,” meaning, the longing of sin—i.e., the evil inclination—which constantly longs and lusts to cause you to stumble...“although you have the ability to subdue it,” meaning, if a person wishes, he will overpower it.

The implication is that each man is capable of overcoming sin if he really wishes to do so. This may or may not be difficult, and may require some reconditioning, but it is still possible.

Although there are many vices, the Sages of Israel have said that most people are drawn to "stealing" what does not belong to them, while fewer people are inclined to "uncover the nakedness" of others, a euphemism for lechery. On lust, Shalom Shabazi (1619– c. 1720) calls it "a phenomenon of the soul," and lays out ways in which a person tempted by lust can overcome the urge, without being swept into its clutches.

Positive role of the evil inclination
However, rabbinic sources also describe the yetzer hara (when properly channeled) as necessary for the continuation of society, as sexual lust motivates the formation of families, and greed motivates work:

Personification of evil
Although certain ancient groups of Jews appear to have believed in the existence of supernatural evil, in particular fallen angels (as in the Dead Sea scrolls), the yetzer hara in non-apocryphal sources is presented as a personification of evil distinct from the supernatural Devil of traditional Christianity and Islam. This tendency to demythologize Satan is found in the Babylonian Talmud and other rabbinical works, e.g.: "Resh Laqish said: Satan, the evil inclination, and the Angel of Death are all one." Notably, however, this and other passages of the Talmud do not deny the external existence of Satan, but create a synthesis between external and internal forces of evil. Similar tendencies can also be found in some Enlightenment Christian writers, such as in the religious writings of Isaac Newton.

Countering the effects of Yetzer hara
Many of the enactments made by the rabbis throughout the centuries are actual "safeguards" to distance a person from his natural inclination and make it harder for him to sin. David's prohibition against yichud (the decree which forbids a man to be secluded in a room with a woman unrelated to him), and the rules outlining the conduct of Jews when entering a public bath house, are a just a few examples.

See also 
 Anger in Judaism
 Concupiscence
 Devil
 Lashon hara, evil tongue
 Original sin
 Repentance in Judaism
 Satan

References

Notes

Further reading 
 .

External links 
 "The Birth of the Good Inclination" at My Jewish Learning
 Judaism 101—A Glossary of Basic Jewish Terms and Concepts
 The Role of the Yetzer HaRa
 Ohr Somayach - Ask The Rabbi / Is man intrinsically evil?

Jewish theology
Hebrew words and phrases in Jewish law
Hebrew words and phrases in the Hebrew Bible
Talmud concepts and terminology